Reber pri Škofljici is a small settlement east of Škofljica in central Slovenia. The entire Municipality of Škofljica was traditionally part of the Lower Carniola region and is now included in the Central Slovenia Statistical Region.

Name
The name of the settlement was changed from Reber to Reber pri Škofljici in 1953.

References

External links

Reber pri Škofljici on Geopedia

Populated places in the Municipality of Škofljica